Drakelow Power Station refers to a series of three now decommissioned and demolished coal-fired power stations located  south of Burton upon Trent, Staffordshire in the West Midlands of England, on the River Trent. However, the station was actually located in the county of Derbyshire, in the East Midlands. The power station was a distinguishable landmark of Burton, which is most famous for its breweries.

History

Pre-Construction

The Drakelow power stations were built on the site of Drakelow Hall, a stately home on the south bank of the River Trent. Twenty eight generations of the Gresley family had considered the estate as their ancestral home. It had appeared in the Domesday Book and the family could trace its history back to the time of the Norse Vikings. A book that was published in 1899, "The Gresleys of Drakelowe", is the accepted history of the family. The hall was demolished in 1934 and its site then earmarked for development in the early 1940s. The remains of the Elizabethan hall occupied part of the site even after the power station was built.

Construction
By the 1940s, the estate was no longer owned by the Gresley family, but by Sir Clifford Gothard. The sale of the land was agreed for a three stage development of electricity generation on the site. Planning permission for the construction of the station was granted in March 1950. The £23 Million project was considered a great technological advancement in its day. Rapid progress was being made with the development of larger boilers and generator units. Drakelow A Power Station was commissioned in 1955 and had 2 × 60 MW and 2 × 62 MW English Electric turbo-alternators giving a total capacity of 240 megawatts (MW). By the time of its opening, work had already started on its larger 480 MW sister, Drakelow B Power Station. It used four 120 MW C.A. Parsons units and was commissioned between 1959 and 1960. Both the A and B stations were brick built. The A station had two chimneys each at 360 ft high. B station also had two chimneys (slightly taller) at 400 ft high. They were cooled by four cooling towers each 300 ft high.

The third, final and largest stage of the build was then underway with the construction of Drakelow C Power Station. Work began in 1960, and the station beginning generating in 1964. The architect was Frankland Dark of Farmer & Dark. With six larger,  cooling towers, two  chimneys and two 350MW and two 375MW generators (the CEGB Statistical Yearbook 1980-81 says there were two 326 MW and one 325 MW generators), it dwarfed both the A and B stations put together, having a total generating capacity of 1450. The cooling towers were arranged in two groups of three, and one tower in each group was coloured a warm red to bring them visually forward, as had been done at West Burton power station. The total generation capacity was 2170 MW over the three stations, making it the largest electricity generation site in Europe for a time.

Operations
Drakelow power stations were supplied with coal via a branch off the adjacent Leicester and Burton railway line. Rail facilities included east- and west-facing junctions on the mainline, A and B station reception sidings, a merry-go-round loop with an associated coal hopper; the reception and departure sidings for the C station included weighbridges, coal hoppers, and ash and coal sidings.

The cooling water system enabled the abstraction of up to 36,400 m3/h (8 million gallons per hour) of water from the River Trent.

The A station boilers operated on pulverised coal and delivered 260.0 kg/s of steam at 103.4 bar and 566 °C. In 1980/1 the thermal efficiency was 25.51 per cent.

The B station boilers also operated on pulverised coal and delivered 432.0 kg/s of steam at 103.4 bar and 538 °C. Drakelow B was one of the CEGB’s twenty steam power stations with the highest thermal efficiency; in 1959-60 the thermal efficiency was 32.38 per cent, in 1963–4 the thermal efficiency was 33.81 per cent, 33.26 per cent in 1964–5, and 31.49 per cent in 1965–6. The annual electricity output of Drakelow B was: 

The C station boilers operated on pulverised coal and delivered 788.0 kg/s of steam at 241.3/158.6 bar and 593/566 °C. In 1980/1 the thermal efficiency was 29.60 per cent. The electricity output was: 

The Drakelow power stations had a workforce of hundreds of people. The station had its own Football, Cricket and Rugby clubs and became part of the community by holding various charity events. Drakelow also proudly boasted a clean accident record. A popular nature trail was housed within the station's grounds.

The station itself did experience several events in its time. A minor fire broke out at the station in the early 1980s and part of C Station was flooded when the River Trent burst its banks in 2000. Overall however, the station flowed through a rather seamless life.

The Drakelow site's ownership changed hands on several occasions. It was sold to TXU, an American company, and then in the early 1990s, to Powergen. Powergen were then bought out by E.ON UK in 2001.

Closure and demolition
The A station closed in 1984 and the B station closed in 1993 after surpassing its designed life expectancy. The cooling towers were demolished on 20 December 1998 and by this time the four chimneys and main buildings had also been demolished, leaving only the C Station operating.

One of the station's generating sets was taken out of operation in 1995, reducing the station's capacity by 333 MW. There had been talk about the closure of Drakelow C Power Station since late 2002. However, in January 2003, E.ON announced that the station was to close and on 31 March 2003, the C station was desynchronized from the National Grid. It was mothballed soon after and left standing until October 2005. At 05.00 a.m. on 17 November 2005, the two tall chimneys were demolished.

The six remaining cooling towers were scheduled to be demolished in July 2006. However, the six towers remained standing past their blow down time as a fault with the detonator was found. This was a disappointment for the thousands of spectators which had gathered to see the demolition. A new date for the demolition was set for 20 September 2006 at 10.00 p.m., when the towers finally came down - but again, not without fault. One set of towers came down at 10.00 p.m., but the other three failed after rabbits had chewed through the detonation cord. However at 10.50 p.m. the final set of towers came crashing down, ending the era of Drakelow Power Station.

Future plans
In September 2005, E.ON applied for government permission to build a 1,220 MW CCGT gas-fired power station on the site of the coal-fired stations. It would cost £350 million to construct and would consist of three generating units. On 16 October 2007, section 36 consent was granted to allow for the construction of the new station. They had planned for construction to begin in 2008, with the goal of having the plant operational by early 2011. Work on these power stations has not yet begun. There are also plans to build a biomass-fired power station on the site. Plans have been put in for 2200 homes to be built on the site and at the same time e-on put in plans to double the size of the plant and now will power 2 million homes. If the plans had been accepted it would have been up and running by 2017. As of May 2020, no work has begun on the site.

However in 2019  plans were approved for the site to be use as a waste to energy facility with the aim to process 169,500 tonnes of waste each year with the hope this will provide energy for 14,000 homes.

The plans from Future Earth Energy were originally approved in 2015 but the firm has significantly changed the design of the new plant and asked to operate for an extra five years.

However in May 2020 Vital Energi instead signed a major contract to develop the new energy-from-waste facility on the site with construction of the facility scheduled to be completed by 2023 and Vital Energi  having a 30-year concession to operate it, with the owners EON offering a 33 year lease.

References

External links

 'Power Stations Revisited' webpage on Drakelow Power Station
 Demolition of turbine hall on YouTube
 Demolition of boiler house on YouTube
 Drakelow 'C' power station on Historic England.

Coal-fired power stations in England
Borough of East Staffordshire
Buildings and structures in Staffordshire
E.ON
Power stations in the East Midlands
1955 establishments in England
2003 disestablishments in England
Demolished buildings and structures in England
Demolished power stations in the United Kingdom
Former coal-fired power stations in the United Kingdom